The 1979–80 New York Knicks season was the 34th season for the team in the National Basketball Association (NBA). In the regular season, the Knicks finished in a tie for third place in the Atlantic Division with a 39–43 win–loss record, and did not qualify for the 1980 NBA Playoffs. Bill Cartwright led the team in scoring (21.7 points per game) and rebounding, while Micheal Ray Richardson led the NBA in assists (10.2 per game) and steals (3.23 per game).

New York had three first-round picks in the 1979 NBA draft, and selected Cartwright, Larry Demic, and Sly Williams. At the end of the season, the Knicks lost five of their last six games; they followed a three-game losing streak with a win against the Cleveland Cavaliers, but then lost to the Boston Celtics and Philadelphia 76ers. In the game against the 76ers, Julius Erving made the winning basket with one second remaining, after the Knicks had committed a turnover on an inbounds pass five seconds earlier with the score tied at 101–101. The Washington Bullets gained the last playoff berth in the Eastern Conference over the Knicks because of a better record against other teams in the conference; the teams' overall win–loss records were identical.

Draft picks

Roster

Regular season

Season standings

z – clinched division title
y – clinched division title
x – clinched playoff spot

Record vs. opponents

Game log

Regular season

Player statistics

Awards and records
Bill Cartwright, NBA All-Rookie Team 1st Team

Transactions

References

New York Knicks seasons
New
New York Knicks
New York Knicks
1980s in Manhattan
Madison Square Garden